This is a list of football (soccer) clubs in American Samoa.1

 Atu'u Broncos
 Atu'u Broncos B
 Aua Old School
 Autali Misasa Katolik
 Black Roses
 FC SKBC 
 Fagasa Youth
 Fagatogo Blue
 Flame On
 Green Bay
 Ilaoa & Toomata
 Kiwi Soccers
 Konica
 Konica Airbase
 Lauli'i
 Lion Heart
 Lion Heart B
 Manuula Heat
 Pacific Products
 Pago Eagles
 Pago Youth
 Pago Youth B
 PanSa East
 Peace Brothers
 Renegades
 Tafuna Jets
 Tafuna Jets B
 Tafuna Jets C
 Taputimu Youth
 Utulei Youth
 Vaiala Tongan
 Vaiala Tongan B
 Vailoatai Youth
 Vaitogi United

Notes
Note 1: This list involves all teams that played in the FFAS Senior League from 2006 to 2015.

External links
 RSSSF

American Samoa
 
Football clubs
Football clubs